is an arcade game which was released by Namco in 1989, only in Japan; it runs on Namco System 1 hardware, and was designed by Akira Usukura (who had designed Splatterhouse the previous year).

Gameplay

A cutscene called "The Rompers Show" also appears after every tenth round, and once Chap has rescued Rumina at the end of the game, they both go back to free Tsukaima (who, ironically, is trapped under a wall, given that she cannot be crushed by them in the game), and wrap her feet up with bandages; Chap then starts to carry Tsukaima off on his back, which angers Rumina as he went through a lot to save her.

Release 
At the time of its release, Rompers was ported to many home video game consoles, and it was given an official North American release, possibly due to one of the enemies, Fumajime Pyokorin, being involved in drug use, and the Japanese voice samples; the game's soundtrack was released in two compilation discs known as Namco Video Game Graffiti Volume 5, and Namco Video Game Graffiti Volume 6, which included soundtracks for other Namco games as well. The first official home conversion for the game was in Namco Museum Encore, the series' only Japanese-exclusive installment (which also featured Wonder Momo and was released on the PlayStation) - and in 2009, Rompers went on to appear on the Nintendo Wii's Japanese Virtual Console market. The original arcade version finally got its first official North American release in June of 2018, as one of the titles included in Pac-Man's Pixel Bash. Its second North American appearance came in March of 2021, as one of the twelve titles included on the Namco Legacy Edition arcade cabinet from Arcade1Up. In September 2022, it was released as part of the Arcade Archives series by Hamster on PlayStation 4 and Nintendo Switch.

Reception 
In Japan, Game Machine listed Rompers on their March 15, 1989 issue as being the seventh most-successful table arcade game of the year.

Notes

References

External links

1989 video games
Arcade video games
Japan-exclusive video games
Maze games
Namco arcade games
Nintendo Switch games
PlayStation 4 games
Video games developed in Japan
Virtual Console games
Multiplayer and single-player video games
Hamster Corporation games